The Skåneleden trail is a long-distance walking trail that stretches all over the beautiful countryside of Skåne, situated in the very south of Sweden. The trail is 1250 km long and divided into five separate trails, with a total of 107 sections. The trail can easily be recognized by the orange trail marks along the footpath. The trail runs from the west to east and from north to south and passes through a highly diversified landscape such as rocky coastlines, undulating ridges, deep forests and white sandy beaches. Parts of the trail is accessible in the wheel chair.

Throughout the trail, there are about 90 permanent shelters at camp sites. The trail is included in the 6,000-km long North Sea Trail, which passes through Sweden, Norway, Denmark, Germany, the Netherlands and the United Kingdom.

On behalf of Region Skåne, the Scanian Landscape Foundation manages the trail, including functions of coordinating the municipal work and the contact with the visitors. The municipalities are in turn responsible for the maintenance of the trail.

Sub-trails 
The five separate segments are:

  (Coast to coast), 370 km (two divisions, East and West), stretching from Sölvesborg in the east to Ängelholm in the west.
  (North to south), 325 km (two divisions, North and South), stretching from Hårsjö (west of Vittsjö) in the north to Trelleborg in the south. The southern section passes through Dalby Söderskog, Skåne's smallest and oldest national park.
  (Ridge to ridge), 162 km – Stretching from Åstorp to Brösarp. This part of the trail runs through Söderåsen National Park – Skåne's largest national park.
 , 188 km, starting and ending in Ystad. Between the cities of Simrishamn and Kivik the trail passes through Stenshuvud National Park. The northern part of the trail passes through Brösarps slopes and Hallamölla waterfall.
 , 172 km – Stretching from Utvälinge in the north to Malmö in the south. A detached part runs from Foteviken bay to the Falsterbo Canal.
 , - 150 km. The most recent addition to Skåneleden stretches from Bökestad to Drakamöllan, passing Vatttenriket in Kristianstad and will be complete in 2023. The first four sections between Norra Lingenäset and Nyehusen will be finished in May, 2020.

Gallery

External links 
 Official website

References 

Hiking trails in Sweden